Paratalanta cultralis is a species of moth in the family Crambidae. It is found in Russia, Japan and Turkey.

References

Moths described in 1867
Pyraustinae
Moths of Japan
Insects of Turkey